Barry Dean Thomas (June 8, 1932 – October 4, 2017) was an American sound engineer. He was nominated for an Academy Award in the category Best Sound for the film Days of Heaven.

Selected filmography
 Days of Heaven (1978)

References

External links

1932 births
2017 deaths
American audio engineers
People from Hollywood, Los Angeles